Tyee may refer to:

 Tyee salmon, another name for Chinook salmon, a fish species
 Tyee Mountain, Vancouver Island, British Columbia, Canada
 Tyee, Oregon, United States, an unincorporated community
 a tribal chief of the Chinookan peoples in the Pacific Northwest of the United States
 Tyee High School, SeaTac, Washington, United States
 The Tyee, an independent online Canadian news magazine that primarily covers British Columbia
 Tyee, a variety of the West Teke language spoken in the Republic of the Congo and Gabon
 Tyee, yearbook of the University of Washington

See also
 Tyee Formation, a geologic formation in Oregon
 Tyee Sandstone, a geologic formation in Oregon